Bijelić is a Serbo-Croatian surname, derived from the word bijelo meaning "white" (Ijekavian form). It may refer to:

Jovan Bijelić
Severin Bijelić
Martin Bijelić

See also
Belić, surname
Bjelić, surname
Bilić (surname)
Bijelići, toponym

Serbian surnames